Bruce Martin Jakosky (born December 9, 1955) is a professor of Geological Sciences and associate director of the Laboratory for Atmospheric and Space Physics (LASP) at the University of Colorado, Boulder. He has been involved with the Viking, Solar Mesosphere Explorer, Clementine, Mars Observer, Mars Global Surveyor, Mars Odyssey, Mars Science Laboratory and MAVEN spacecraft missions, and is involved in planning future spacecraft missions.

Biography

Career
Jakosky heads the University of Colorado at Boulder team within the NASA Astrobiology Institute. He was a  research associate at Laboratory for Atmospherics and Space Physics from 1982 to 1988. He serves on numerous national advisory committees and is an associate director at the Laboratory for Atmospheric and Space Physics at the University of Colorado at Boulder. He is an expert in Earth and planetary geology and extraterrestrial life, including both the science and the societal and philosophical issues relating to the science. His research interests are in the geology of planetary surfaces, specifically the geology of Mars, the evolution of the martian atmosphere and climate, atmospheric chemistry, the potential for life on Mars and elsewhere, and the philosophical and societal issues in astrobiology.

In September 2008, the MAVEN project, a Mars orbiter, was chosen as an upcoming NASA exploration mission. The probe was launched on November 18, 2013. Jakosky served as MAVEN's principal investigator from inception in 2003 until he stepped down on August 31, 2021, passing the leadership on to Shannon Curry. The $485 million program represents the largest research contract ever awarded to the University of Colorado at Boulder.

Selected publications

Books
Jakosky, B.M. (1998). The search for life on other planets, Cambridge University Press.
Jakosky, B.M. (2006). Science, Society, and the Search for Life in the Universe, Univ. Arizona Press.

Articles and essays
Henderson, B.G., B.M. Jakosky and C.E. Randall, A Monte Carlo Model of Polarized Thermal Emission from Particulate Planetary Surfaces, Icarus, 99, 51, 1992
Jakosky, B.M., Out on a limb: Martian atmospheric dust opacity during the past hundred years, Icarus, 117, 352–357, 1995
Mellon, M.T., and B.M. Jakosky, The distribution and behavior of martian ground ice during past and present epochs, J. Geophys. Res., 100, E6, 11,781-11,799, 1995
Henderson, B.G., P.G. Lucey, and B.M. Jakosky, New laboratory measurements of Mid-IR emission spectra of simulated planetary surfaces, J. Geophys. Res., 101, No. E, 14,969-14,975, 1996
Hutchins, K.S., and B.M. Jakosky, Evolution of Martian atmospheric argon: Implications for sources of volatiles, J. Geophys. Res., 101, No. E, 14,933-14,949, 1996
Hutchins, K.S., and B.M. Jakosky, Impact of a paleo-magnetic field on sputtering loss of martian atmospheric argon and neon, J. Geophys. Res., In Press, 1996
Hutchins, K.S., and B.M. Jakosky, Sources of martian atmospheric volatiles, J. Geophys. Res., Submitted, 1996
Hutchins, K.S., and B.M. Jakosky, Carbonates in martian meteorite ALH84001: A planetary perspective on formation temperature, Geophys. Res. Lett., In Press, 1996
Jakosky, B.M., Warm havens for life on Mars, New Scientist, 150, 38–42, 1996
Jakosky, B.M., Martian stable isotopes: Volatile evolution, climate change, and exobiological implications, Orig. Life Evol. Biosphere, Submitted, 1996
Jakosky, B.M., R.C. Reedy, and J. Masarik, Carbon 14 measurements of the martian atmosphere as an indicator of atmosphere-regolith exchange of CO2, J. Geophys. Res., 101, 2247–2252, 1996
Mellon, M.T., B.M. Jakosky, and S.E. Postawko, The persistence of equatorial ground ice on Mars, J. Geophys. Res., Submitted, 1996
Urquhart, M.L., and B.M. Jakosky, Constraints on the solid-state greenhouse effect on the icy Galileo satellites, J. Geophys. Res., 101, No. E, 21,169-21,176, 1996
Urquhart, M.L., and B.M. Jakosky, Lunar thermal emission and remote determination of surface properties, J. Geophys. Res., In Press, 1996
Brain, D.A., and B.M. Jakosky, Atmospheric loss since the onset of the martian geologic record: The combined role of impact erosion and sputtering, J. Geophys. Res., Submitted, 1997
Henderson, B.G., and B.M. Jakosky, Near-surface thermal gradients and mid-IR emission spectra: A new model including scattering and application to real data, J. Geophys. Res., 102, No. E, 6567–6580, 1997
Hutchins, K.S.y, B.M. Jakosky, and J.G. Luhmann, Impact of a paleomagnetic field on sputtering loss of Martian atmospheric argon and neon, J. Geophys. Res., 102, No. E, 9183–9189, 1997
Jakosky, B.M., Mars mission satisfies age-old need to explore, Op-Ed piece, Daily Camera, 1-20, 1997
Jakosky, B.M., Martian exobiology, J. Geophys. Res., 102, 23,673-23,674, 1997
Jakosky, B.M., Mars life? One year later, The Planetary Report, 17, 10–13, 1997
Jakosky, B.M., Laying out the evidence: The case for life on Mars, Planetary Report, 17, 12–17, 1997
Jakosky, B.M., A.P. Zent and R.W. Zurek, The Mars water cycle: Determining the role of exchange with the regolith, Icarus, 130, 87–95, 1997
Jakosky, B.M., and E.L. Shock, The biological potential of Mars, the early Earth, and Europa, J. Geophys. Res., Submitted, 1997
Jakosky, B.M., and J.H. Jones, The history of martian volatiles, Rev. Geophys., 135, 1–16, 1997
Jakosky, B.M., and J.H. Jones, The History of Martian Volatiles, Rev. of Geophys., 35, No. 1, 1–16, 1997
Jakosky, B.M., and others, Preliminary results of the Clementine Long-Wave Infrared Camera, J. Geophys. Res., Submitted, 1997
Urquhart, M.L., and B.M. Jakosky, Lunar thermal emission and remote determination of surface properties, J. Geophys. Res., 102, No. E, 10,959-10,969, 1997
Brain, D.A., and B.M. Jakosky, Atmospheric loss since the onset of the martian geologic record: Combined role of impact erosion and sputtering, J. Geophys. Res., 103, 22,689-22,694, 1998
Colaprete, A., and B.M. Jakosky, Ice flow and rock glaciers on Mars, J. Geophys. Res., 103, 5897–5909, 1998
Jakosky, B.M., Opinion: Searching for life in the universe, The Planetary Report, July/, 1998
Jakosky, B.M., Searching for life in our solar system, Sci. American Presents... (Magnificent Cosmos), 9(1), 16–21, 1998
Jakosky, B.M., and E.L. Shock, The biological potential of Mars, the early Earth, and Europa, J. Geophys. Res., 103, 19,359-19,364, 1998
Jakosky, B.M., et al., Long-wave infrared observations of the Moon from the Clementine spacecraft: Preliminary results, J. Geophys. Res., Submitted, 1998
Jakosky, B.M., Martian stable isotopes: Volatile evolution, climate change, and exobiological implications, Origins Life Evolution Biospheres, 29, 47–57, 1999
Jakosky, B.M., The atmospheres of the terrestrial planets, in The New Solar System, 4th ed., edited by J.K. Beatty, C.C. Peterson, and A. Chaikin, Sky Publishing Corp., 175–192, 1999
Jakosky, B.M., Water, climate and life, Science, 283, 648–649, 1999
Jakosky, B.M., M.T. Mellon, H.H. Kieffer, P.R. Christensen, E.S. Varnes, S.W. Lee, The thermal inertia of Mars from the Mars Global Surveyor Thermal Emission Spectrometer, J. Geophys. Res., In Press, 1999
Jakosky, B.M., and M.P. Golombek, Planetary science, astrobiology, and the role of science and exploration in society, EOS (Trans. Amer. Geophys. Union) Forum, In Press, 1999
Lawson, S.L., B.M. Jakosky, H.-S. Park, and M.T. Mellon, The Clementine Long-wave infrared global data set: Brightness temperatures of the lunar surface, J. Geophys. Res., In Press, 1999
Urquhart, M.L., and B.M. Jakosky, Impact of near-surface thermal gradients on lunar thermal emission and subsurface temperatures, J. Geophys. Res., Submitted, 1999
Varnes, E.S., and B.M. Jakosky, Stability and lifetime of organic molecules at the surface of Europs, Icarus, Submitted, 1999
B.M. Jakosky, Philosophical aspects of astrobiology, in "Bioastronomy '99: A New Era in Bioastronomy", edited by G.A. Lemarchand and K.J. Meech, Astron. Soc. Pac., 661–666, In Press, 2000
Jakosky, B.M. and M.P. Golombeck, Planetary science, astrobiology, and the role of science and exploration in society, EOS (Trans. Amer. Geophys. Union) Forum, 81, No.6, 58, In Press, 2000
Jakosky, B.M. and M.T. Mellon, Thermal inertia of Mars: Sites of exobiological interest, J. Geophys. Res., In Press, 2000
Jakosky, B.M., M.T. Mellon, H.H. Kieffer, P.R. Christensen, E.S. Varnes and S.W. Lee, The thermal inertia of Mars from the Mars Global Surveyor Thermal Emission Spectrometer, J. Geophys. Res., 105, 9643–9652, In Press, 2000
Lawson, S.L., B.M. Jakosky, H.-S. Park and M.T. Mellon, Brightness temperatures of the lunar surface: Calibration and global analysis of the Clementine long-wave infrared camera d, J. Geophys. Res., 105, No.E2, 4273–4290, In Press, 2000
Mellon, M.T., B.M. Jakosky, H.H. Kieffer and P.R. Christensen, High-resolution thermal-inertia mapping from the Mars Global Surveyor Thermal Emission Spectrometer, Icarus, 148, 437–455, In Press, 2000
Ruff, S.W., P.R. Christensen, R.N. Clark, H.H. Kieffer, M.C. Malin, J.L. Bandfield, B.M. Jakosky, M.D. Lane, M.T. Mellon and M.A. Presley, Mars' "White Rock" feature lacks evidence of an aqueous origin: Results from Mars Global Surveyor, J. Geophys. Res., In Press, 2000
Pelkey, S.M., B.M. Jakosky and M.T. Mellon, Thermal in inertia of crater-related wind streaks on Mars, J. Geophys. Res., Submitted, 2001
Christensen, P.R., J.L. Bandfield, V.E. Hamilton, S.W. Ruff, H.H. Kieffer, T. Titus, M.C. Malin, R.V. Morris, M.D. Lane, R.L. Clark, B.M. Jakosky, M.T. Mellon, J.C. Pearl, B.J. Conrath, M.D. Smith, R.T. Clancy, R.O. Kuzmin, T. Roush, G.L. Mehall, N. Gorel, Mars Global Surveyor Thermal Emission Spectrometer experiment: Investigation description and surface science results, J. Geophys. Res., 106, 23,823-23,871, 2001
Colwell, J.E. and B.M. Jakosky, Effects of topography on thermal infrared spectra of planetary surfaces, J. Geophys. Res., 107, No. E, 16–1 to 16–6, 10.1029/2001JE001829, 2001
Jakosky, B.M. and M.T. Mellon, High-resolution thermal-inertia mapping of Mars: Sites of exobiological relevance, J. Geophys. Res., 106, 23,887-23,907, 2001
Jakosky, B.M. and R.J. Phillips, Mars' volatile and climate history, Nature, 412, 237–244, 2001
Jakosky, B.M., and M.T. Mellon, High-resolution thermal-inertia mapping of mars: Sites of exobiological relevance, J. Geophys. Res., 106, E10, 23,165-23,907, 2001
Jakosky, B.M., and R.J. Phillips, Mars volatile and climate evolution: Water the major constraints?, Nature (Insight), 412, 6843, 237–244, 2001
Lawson, S.L. and B.M. Jakosky, Lunar surface thermophysical properties derived from Clementine LWIR and UVVIS images, J. Geophys. Res., 106, 27911–27932, 2001
Pelkey, S.M., B.M. Jakosky and M.T. Mellon, Thermal inertia of crater-related wind streaks on Mars, J. Geophys. Res., 106, E10, 23,909-23,920, 2001
Phillips, R.J., M.T. Zuber, S.C. Solomon, M.P. Golombek, B.M. Jakosky, W.B. Banerdt, D. E. Smith, R.M.E. Williams, B.M. Hynek, O. Aharonson, and S.A. Hauck II, Ancient geodynamics and global-scale hydrology on Mars, Science, 291, 2587–2591, 2001
Ruff, S.W., P.R. Christensen, R.N. Clark, H.H. Kieffer, M.C. Malin, J.L. Bandfield, B.M. Jakosky, M.D. Lane, M.T. Mellon, and M.A. Presley, Mars' White Rock feature lacks evidence of an aqueous origin: Results from Mars Global Surveyor, J. Geophys. Res., 106, 23,921-23,927, 2001
Pelkey, S.M. and B.M. Jakosky, Surficial geologic surveys of Gale Crater and Melas Crater, Mars, Icarus, 160, 228–257, 2002
Drake, M.J. and B.M. Jakosky, Narrow horizons in astrobiology, Nature, 415, 733–734, 2004
Pelkey, S.M., B.M. Jakosky, and P.R. Christensen (2004). Surficial properties in Gale Crater, Mars, from Mars Odyssey THEMIS data, Icarus, 167, 244–270.
Jakosky, B.M. and M.T. Mellon (2004). Water on Mars, Phys. Today, 57, 71–76.
Jakosky, B.M., F. Westall, and A. Brack (2004). Mars, in Astrobiology (J. Baross and W. Sullivan, eds.), in press.
Christensen, P.R., S.W. Ruff, R. Fergason, N. Gorelick, B.M. Jakosky, M.D. Lane, A.S. McEwen, H.Y. McSween, G.L. Mehall, K. Milam, J.E. Moersch, S.M. Pelkey, A.D. Rogers, and M.B. Wyatt (2005). Mars Exploration Rover candidate landing sites as viewed by THEMIS, Icarus, 176, 12–43.
Solomon, S.C., O. Aharonson, J.M. Aurnou, W.B. Banerdt, M.H. Carr, A.J. Dombard, H.V. Frey, M.P. Golombek, S.A. Hauck II, J.W. Head III. B.M. Jakosky, C.L. Johnson, P.J. McGovern, G.A. Neumann, R.J. Phillips, D.E. Smith, and M.T. Zuber (2005). New perspectives on ancient Mars, Science, 307, 1214–1220.
Jakosky, B.M., M.T. Mellon, E.S. Varnes, W.C. Feldman, W.V. Boynton, and R.M. Haberle (2005). Mars low-latitude neutron distribution: Possible remnant near-surface water ice and a mechanism for its recent emplacement, Icarus, 175, 58–67.
Martinez-Alonso, S., B.M. Jakosky, M.T. Mellon, and N.E. Putzig (2005). A volcanic interpretation of Gusev Crater surface materials from thermophysical, spectral, and morphological evidence, J. Geophys. Res., 110, E01003, .
Christensen, P.R., H.Y. McSween Jr., J. L. Bandfield, S.W. Ruff, A.D. Rogers, V.E. Hamilton, N. Gorelick, M. B. Wyatt, B.M. Jakosky, H. H. Kieffer, M.C. Malin, and J. E. Moersch (2005), Evidence for magmatic evolution and diversity on Mars from infrared observations, Nature, .
Link, L.S., B.M. Jakosky, and G.D. Thyne (2005). Biological potential of low-temperature aqueous environments on Mars, Int. J. Astrobiology, 4, 155–164.
Martinez-Alonso, S., M.T. Mellon, B.C. Kindel, and B.M. Jakosky (2006). Mapping compositional diversity on the surface of Mars: The spectral variance index, J. Geophys. Res., 111, 10.1029/2005JE002492.
Chojnacki, M., B.M. Jakosky, and B.M. Hynek (2006). Surficial properties of landslides and surrounding units in Ophir Chasma, Mars, J. Geophys. Res., 111, E04005, 
Jakosky, B. M., B. M. Hynek, S. M. Pelkey, M. T. Mellon, S. Martínez-Alonso, N. E. Putzig, N. Murphy, and P. R. Christensen (2006). Thermophysical properties of the MER and Beagle II landing site regions on Mars, J. Geophys. Res., 111, E08008, .
Des Marais, D.J., B.M. Jakosky, and B.M. Hynek (2006). Astrobiological implications of Mars surface composition and properties, in Mars Surface Composition, Mineralogy, and Physical Properties, J.F. Bell III, ed., Cambridge Univ. Press, in press.

References

External links
Maven Mission Website
CU Boulder Maven special report

1955 births
Living people
University of Colorado Boulder faculty
Planetary scientists
Astrobiologists